Naustdal is a village in Sunnfjord Municipality in Vestland county, Norway. The village is located on the northern shore of the Førdefjorden at the mouth of the river Nausta, which flows through the Naustdalen valley. Kletten Hill rises southeast of the village.

The Naustdal Church is located in this village, and it serves as the main church for the municipality. The village has been the site of a church since the middle ages.

The Naustdal Tunnel has its southern entrance at this village.

The village was the administrative centre of the old Naustdal Municipality prior to its dissolution in 2020.

References

Villages in Vestland
Sunnfjord

fi:Naustdal